Rick Gorzynski is a former American football coach.  He serve as the fourth head football coach at Lindenwood University in St. Charles, Missouri and he held that position for three seasons, from 2001 until 2003.  His record at Lindenwood was 7–26.

Head coaching record

College

References

Year of birth missing (living people)
Living people
American football quarterbacks
Lindenwood Lions football coaches
Truman Bulldogs football players
High school football coaches in Missouri